Paul Weitz may refer to:

Paul J. Weitz (1932–2017), American astronaut
Paul Weitz (filmmaker) (born 1965), American filmmaker